Soleil Meriton is a luxurious residential skyscraper located at 495 Adelaide Street, Brisbane, Australia. Construction began in early 2009, with the building officially ready in 2011. At , it was Queensland's capital city -Brisbane's tallest building until 2013 when Infinity Tower overtook it.

A 68 floor building, it contains 25 floors of serviced apartments and 43 floors of private residential apartments. In total there are 464 apartments. There is no penthouse in the building. The serviced apartments, which includes 50 apartments in the top nine levels, are owned by Meriton.

It is situated on a relatively small  corner site with rear access from Arch Lane. The slender building houses 10 levels of carpark which required one of the biggest excavations in Brisbane's history. Retail space for cafes and restaurants is provided across three levels.

The first building design for the site was rejected by the Brisbane City Council. This design was described as appalling and raised traffic congestion impacts. In late June 2008 a new design was submitted to the council and approved.

The building was officially opened by former Queensland Premier, Anna Bligh and Meriton boss, Harry Triguboff on 20 September 2011 but it was completed in early 2012. Starting at the first floor tenants began moving in as floors were completed.

See also

 List of tallest buildings in Brisbane
 List of tallest buildings in Australia

References

External links

Soleil Brisbane at Meriton (official site)
Soleil at Skyscraperpage.com

Skyscrapers in Brisbane
Residential skyscrapers in Australia
Residential buildings completed in 2012
2012 establishments in Australia
Apartment buildings in Brisbane
Adelaide Street, Brisbane